The Murder of Emmett Till is a 2003 documentary film produced by Firelight Media that aired on the PBS program American Experience.  The film chronicles the story of Emmett Till, a 14-year-old black boy from Chicago visiting relatives in Mississippi in 1955. He was brutally murdered by two white men after a white woman falsely claimed that he had whistled at and groped her.

Emmett's mother, Mamie Till Bradley, insisted on a public funeral with an open casket. Photos of the decaying and mutilated body flooded newspapers, putting the case on the map both nationally and internationally. The two men accused of his murder were acquitted after a short five-day trial with an all-white male jury, making a mockery of any possibility of justice. Shortly afterward, the defendants sold their story to journalists detailing how they carried out the murder. The Emmett Till case was a significant motivator of the Civil Rights Movement, and the Montgomery bus boycott began three months after his body was discovered in the Tallahatchie River.

Awards
2004 Henry Hampton Award for Excellence in Film and Digital Media 
2003 Emmy Award – Best Non-fiction Director Stanley Nelson
2003 Emmy Nomination – Best Screenplay Marcia Smith
2003 International Documentary Association Awards – Distinguished Documentary Achievement
2003 Sundance Film Festival Special Jury Award

See also
 Civil rights movement in popular culture

References 

http://firelightmedia.tv/project/the-murder-of-emmett-till/
http://www.pbs.org/wgbh/amex/till/

2003 television films
2003 films
African-American history of Mississippi
American Experience
Documentary films about African Americans
Documentary films about the civil rights movement
Documentary films about crime in the United States
Documentary films about racism in the United States
Documentary films about United States history
Films directed by Stanley Nelson Jr.
History of Tennessee
2000s American films
Emmett Till in fiction